Club Cristóbal Colón de Juan Augusto Saldívar is a Paraguayan football club based in Juan Augusto Saldívar in the Central Department of Paraguay. The club at the moment competes in the Paraguayan Primera División B.

Notable players
  Cristian Riveros

References

Football clubs in Paraguay